Morgan le Fay is a character in the Arthurian legend.

Morgan le Fay may also refer to:
Morgan le Fay (Marvel Comics), a Marvel Comics character based on the legendary figure
Morgaine le Fey (DC Comics), a DC Comics character based on the legendary figure

See also
Morgana (disambiguation)
Morgaine (disambiguation)